Arjun Sarja is an Indian actor, producer and director who works predominantly in Tamil cinema and he also established his career in  Telugu and Kannada cinema. He debuted as a child actor in the film Simhada Mari Sainya in the year 1981. Sarja had acted in more than 160 movies. He has directed 12 films and also produced and distributed a number of films. After starring in numerous Kannada films with minor roles, he starred in his first movie as an independent actor in Male Bantu Male. In 1984, Sarja made his Tamil Debut in Rama Narayanan's film Nandri. During the subsequent years he acted in many Telugu and Kannada films portraying lead and supporting roles in Premagni (1989), Prathap (1990) and Shivanaga (1992).

Sarja made his directorial debut with the film Sevagan in 1992. In 1993, he starred in his first breakthrough film as a contemporary actor in S. Shankar's Gentleman, which opened to positive reviews, while Sarja went on to win the Tamil Nadu State Film Award for Best Actor. He then starred in commercially successful films such as Jai Hind (1994), Karnaa (1995), and the crime drama film Kurudhipunal (1995). In 1999, he starred in the political thriller Mudhalvan (1999). Sarja won critical acclaim for portraying an ambitious television reporter who became the Chief Minister of Tamil Nadu for a day. The film ran for over 100 days in theaters and won awards on a regional scale. 

In 2000, he starred in Vasanth's film Rhythm. He appeared in several action films in which he directed and featured in lead roles are Ezhumalai (2002) and Parasuram (2003), while also starred in Arasatchi (2004). The films, Giri (2004) and Marudhamalai (2007) were box office hits, while several were average grossers including Madrasi (2006), Vathiyar (2006) and Durai (2008). He portrayed the role of the Hindu deity Hanuman in Krishna Vamsi's devotional film Sri Anjaneyam (2004).

Since 2010, Sarja has attempted to change his "action king" image and played negative roles. In 2011, he starred alongside Ajith Kumar in Venkat Prabhu's crime thriller Mankatha, which became a box office success. The following year he appeared in Kannada film Prasad, for which he won the Karnataka State Film Award for Best Actor. He then starred in Mani Ratnam's Kadal (2013), in which he portrayed in the role of a smuggler, which went on to become a box office failure. In a directorial venture, Jai Hind 2 became a box office success in Kannada, while the Tamil and Telugu versions failed at the box office. In 2017, he starred in his 150th film Nibunan which was simultaneously released in Tamil as Nibunan and Kannada as Vismaya. He then acted in Telugu film Naa Peru Surya, Naa Illu India with Allu Arjun, followed by Irumbu Thirai (2018), a Tamil action movie co-starring Vishal, which later being a blockbuster at the box office.

As actor

As director, producer, writer and distributor

As singer

Television

References 

Indian filmographies
Male actor filmographies